Kunduthode is a small village in northeastern Kozhikode district, Kerala, in southwest India. It is under Nadapuram assembly constituency and Kavilumpara panchayath. The nearest town is Thottilpalam (6 km).

Panchayat administration
Kunduthode is under Kavilumpara grama panchayath. 
President= P G George CPI(M)

History
In the pre independence era, Kunduthode was under British Governorship. There were large rubber producing estates in Kunduthode in 1916. During this period they had built a bungalow in the middle of estate. Workers at the rubber estates began to settle nearby and around the 1930s, the population began to increase. Kunduthdode is also famous for high-yielding Kuttiady coconut trees.

Transportation
Kunduthode is well connected by road network with nearby places. A KSRTC Bus Depot and private Bus stand is situated in the nearest town Thottilpalam (6 km). The main bus services are to Kozhikode, Vatakara, Bangalore, Mananthavady, Thalasserry Palakkad, Ernakulam Kottayam. Local Transportation is mainly with Jeep, auto and buses
Airport – Calicut International Airport is 86 km away. (Karippur - Kozhikode - Perambra - Kuttiady - Thottilpalam)
Kannur international airport – 65 km away
Nearest Railway Station – Vatakara railway station 36 km Away.

How to reach by road
Kozhikode – Ulliyeri-perambra-Kuttiady-Thottilpalam-Kunduthode
Vatakara – Orkkatteri-Nadapuram-Kuttiady-Thottilpalam-Kunduthode
Thalassery – Peringathoor-Nadapuram-Thottilpalam-Kunduthode
Mananthavadi – Vellamunda-Niravilpuzha-Thottilpalam-Kunduthode

Geography
Kunduthode is an area of plain and hills.

Economy
Kunduthode is one of the major agricultural areas in Kozhikode district. The main cash crops are: Cloves (Grambu), nutmeg, coconut, areca nut, ginger, turmeric, and pepper. Many others are engaged in business and other jobs. There are hotels, banks, and rubber plantations in Kunduthode.

Government Offices
Primary Health center Kunduthode
Postal office
Public ration shop

Cultural
Public library
Payas kalavedi

Hospitals
Primary Health center
Further hospital services are available in Thottilpalam(4 km)

Religious
St. Joseph Church
Elakkandi Mahadeva Temple
Vannathiyetu Guruvayoorappan temple
Himayathul Islam Juma Masjid

Educational Institutes
PTChako Memorial HS Kunduthodu
Govt LP school Kunduthode
St. Jose LP School
Himayauthul Islam madrasa
Hidayathu Sibiyan Sunni Madrasa

See also
 Vatakara
 Nadapuram
 Perambra
 Madappally
 Villiappally
 Memunda
 Iringal
 Mahe, Pondicherry
 Payyoli
 Thikkodi
 Orkkatteri

References

Kuttiady area